Australasian literature is an umbrella term for the literary production of Australasian countries: 

 Australian literature
 New Zealand literature